Near Sound Data Transfer (NSDT) is a sound-based mobile transaction technology developed and patented by Tagattitude since 2005. NSDT uses a one time password sent through the audio channel of a mobile device to create an electronic signature enabling secure transactions. Because all mobile telephones have an audio input and output (speaker and microphone) built in, this technology is compatible with all mobile phones in use worldwide.

Applications 
NSDT is primarily used for mobile banking transactions through the mobile money platform Tagpay. It is also used to securely open doors and enable authentication on websites.

See also 
 Air gap (networking)
 Van Eck phreaking

Notes and references 

Wireless